Gymnoscirtetes pusillus, the little wingless grasshopper, is a species of spur-throated grasshopper in the family Acrididae. It is found in North America.

References

 Capinera J.L, Scott R.D., Walker T.J. (2004). Field Guide to Grasshoppers, Katydids, and Crickets of the United States. Cornell University Press.
 Otte, Daniel (1995). "Grasshoppers [Acridomorpha] C". Orthoptera Species File 4, 518.

Further reading

 

Melanoplinae